Adelton Gomes da Silva, better known as Guto, is a Brazilian footballer who acts as a goalkeeper. Currently playing for Brasiliense.

Career
Guto has played for Santa Cruz Futebol Clube in the Campeonato Brasileiro and Copa do Brasil.

Contract
Brasiliense.

References

External links
 zerozero.pt
Profile at Globo Esporte's Futpedia

1976 births
Living people
Brazilian footballers
Santa Cruz Futebol Clube players
Brasiliense Futebol Clube players
Association football goalkeepers
Sportspeople from Rio Grande do Sul